The Bristol-Myers Squibb Company (BMS) is an American multinational pharmaceutical company. Headquartered in New York City, BMS is one of the world's largest pharmaceutical companies and consistently ranks on the Fortune 500 list of the largest U.S. corporations. For fiscal 2022, it had a total revenue of $46.2 billion.

Bristol Myers Squibb manufactures prescription pharmaceuticals and biologics in several therapeutic areas, including cancer, HIV/AIDS, cardiovascular disease, diabetes, hepatitis, rheumatoid arthritis, and psychiatric disorders.

BMS's primary research and development (R&D) sites are located in Lawrence, New Jersey (formerly Squibb, near Princeton), Summit, New Jersey, formerly HQ of Celgene, New Brunswick, New Jersey,  Redwood City, California, and Seville in Spain, with other sites in Devens and Cambridge, Massachusetts, East Syracuse, New York, Braine-l'Alleud, Belgium, Tokyo, Japan, Bangalore, India, and Wirral, United Kingdom. BMS previously had an R&D site in Wallingford, Connecticut (formerly Bristol-Myers).

History

Squibb

The Squibb corporation was founded in 1858 by Edward Robinson Squibb in Brooklyn, New York. Squibb was known as an advocate of quality control and high purity standards early within the pharmaceutical industry. He went on to self-publish an alternative to the U.S. Pharmacopeia titled Squibb's Ephemeris of Materia Medica, after failing to convince the American Medical Association to incorporate higher purity standards. 

Materia Medica, Squibb products, and Edward Squibb's opinion on the fundamentals of pharmacy are found in many medical papers of the late 1800s. The American Journal of Pharmacy published more than one hundred papers of Squibb's research surrounding the industry.

The sons of Edward Squibb sold the company to Lowell M. Palmer and Theodore Weicker in 1905, who incorporated the company. Around this time, the Squibb logo was developed, which represented the company's products of "uniformity, purity, efficacy, and reliability based on research."

Squibb Corporation served as a major supplier of medical goods to the Union Army during the American Civil War, providing portable medical kits containing morphine, surgical anesthetics, and quinine for the treatment of malaria (which was endemic in most of the Eastern United States at that time).

In 1944, Squibb opened the world's largest penicillin plant in New Brunswick, New Jersey.

Bristol-Myers

In 1887, Hamilton College graduates William McLaren Bristol and John Ripley Myers purchased the Clinton Pharmaceutical company of Clinton, New York. In May 1898, they decided to rename it Bristol, Myers and Company. Following Myers' death in 1899, Bristol changed the name to the Bristol-Myers Corporation. 

During the 1890s, the company introduced its first nationally recognized product Sal Hepatica, a laxative mineral salt, followed by Ipana toothpaste in 1901. Other divisions were Clairol (hair colors and haircare) and Drackett (household products such as Windex and Drano).

In 1943, Bristol-Myers acquired Cheplin Biological Laboratories, a producer of acidophilus milk in East Syracuse, New York, and converted the plant to produce penicillin for the World War II Allied forces. After the war, the company renamed the plant Bristol Laboratories in 1945 and entered the civilian antibiotics market, where it faced competition from Squibb. 

Penicillin production at the East Syracuse plant ended in 2005, when it became less expensive to produce overseas. As of 2010, the facility was used for the manufacturing process development and production of other biologic medicines for clinical trials and commercial use.

Merger
In 1989, Bristol-Myers and Squibb merged and became Bristol-Myers Squibb.

In 1999, then-U.S. President Bill Clinton awarded Bristol-Myers Squibb the National Medal of Technology, the nation's highest recognition for technological achievement, "for extending, and enhancing human life through innovative pharmaceutical research and development and for redefining the science of clinical study through groundbreaking and hugely complex clinical trials that are recognized models in the industry."

2000 to 2010

In 2002, the company was involved in a lawsuit of illegally maintaining a monopoly on Taxol, its cancer treatment, and it was again sued for the antitrust lawsuit 5 years later, which cost the company $125 million for settlement.

Also in 2002, Bristol-Myers Squibb was involved in an accounting scandal that resulted in a significant restatement of revenues from 1999 to 2001. The restatement was the result of an improper booking of sales related to "channel stuffing" as the practice of offering excess inventory to customers to create higher sales numbers. The company has since settled with the United States Department of Justice and Securities and Exchange Commission, agreeing to pay $150 million, while neither admitting nor denying guilt.

On October 24, 2002, Bristol-Myers Squibb Co. restated earnings downward for parts of 2000 and 2001, while revising 2002 earnings upward because of its massive inventory backlog imbroglio that spurred two government investigations. On March 15, 2004, Bristol-Myers Squibb Co. adjusted upward its fourth-quarter and full-year 2003 results after reversing an earlier decision about how to deal with accounting errors made in prior years. 

As part of a deferred prosecution agreement, the company was placed under the oversight of a monitor appointed by the U.S. attorney in w Jersey. In addition, the former head of the Pharma group, Richard Lane, and the ex-CFO, Fred Schiff, were indicted for federal securities violations.

In July 2006, an investigation of the company was made public, and the FBI raided the company's corporate offices. The investigation centered on the distribution of Plavix and charges of collusion. On September 12, 2006, the monitor, former Federal Judge Frederick B. Lacey, urged the company to remove then-CEO Peter Dolan over the Plavix dispute. Later that day, BMS announced that Dolan would indeed step down.

The deferred prosecution agreement expired in June 2007 and the Department of Justice did not take any further legal action against the company for matters covered by the DPA. Under CEO Jim Cornelius, who was CEO following Dolan until May 2010, all executives involved in the "channel-stuffing" and generic competition scandals have since left the company.

In 2009, the company began a major restructuring focusing on the pharmaceutical business and biologic products, along with productivity initiatives and cost-cutting and streamlining business operations through a multiyear program of on-going layoffs.  This was part of a business strategy launched in 2007 to transform the company from a large, diversified pharmaceutical company to a specialty biopharma company, which also included the closure of half of their manufacturing facilities.  As another cost-cutting measure, Bristol-Myers Squibb also reduced health-care subsidies for retirees and plans to freeze their pension plan at the end of 2009.

BMS is a Fortune 500 Company (#114 in 2010 list). Newsweek's 2009 Green Ranking recognized Bristol-Myers Squibb as eighth among 500 of the largest United States corporations. Also, BMS was included in the 2009 Dow Jones Sustainability North America Index of leading sustainability-driven companies.

Lamberto Andreotti was named CEO in 2010; he had previously served as "president and COO responsible for all pharmaceutical operations worldwide."

2010 onward

In 2010, Lou Schmukler joined Bristol-Myers Squibb as the president of global product development and design. Schmukler led the team that completed the company's strategic transformation to a specialty biopharmaceutical company that had begun in 2007.  As of 2011, the company had a dozen manufacturing facilities and six product development sites.

Citing major developments and a market capitalization of US$87 billion and stock appreciation of 61.4%, Bristol-Myers Squibb was ranked as the best drug company of 2013 by Forbes magazine.

In December 2014, the company received FDA approval for the use of the PD-1 inhibitor nivolumab (Opdivo) in treating patients whose skin cancer cannot be removed or have not responded to previous drug therapies. In February 2015, the company initiated a research partnership with Rigel Pharmaceuticals which could generate more than $339 million. In March, the company obtained an exclusive opportunity to both licence and commercialise PROSTVAC, Bavarian Nordic's phase III prostate-specific antigen targeting cancer immunotherapy. Bavarian Nordic would receive an upfront payment of $60 million and incremental payments up to $230 million, if the overall survival of test patients exceeds that seen in Phase II tests. Bavarian could also receive milestone payments of between $110 million and $495 million, dependent on regulatory authorization, and these payments have the potential to total up to $975 million.

In May 2015, Dr. Giovanni Caforio became CEO of the company; Caforio was formerly the company's COO and succeeded Andreotti upon his retirement. Andreotti subsequently succeeded James Cornelius as executive chairman upon his retirement.

In late February 2017, The Wall Street Journal and Fortune, among others, reported that activist investor Carl Icahn had taken a stake in the company, signaling a potential future takeover from the likes of Gilead Sciences.

In April 2018, the company reported net income of $1.5 billion, or 91 cents per share, for the first quarter of the year, thanks to the increased sales of their cancer drug Opdivo.

Corporate acquisitions and divestments as Bristol Myers Squibb 

In August 2009, during a major restructuring activity, BMS acquired the biotechnology firm Medarex as part of the company's "String of Pearls" strategy of alliances, partnerships, and acquisitions. In November 2009, Bristol Myers Squibb announced that it was "splitting off" Mead Johnson Nutrition by offering BMY shareholders the opportunity to exchange their stock for shares in Mead Johnson. According to Bristol Myers Squibb, this move was expected to further sharpen the company's focus on biopharmaceuticals.

In October 2010, the company acquired ZymoGenetics, securing an existing product, as well as pipeline assets in hepatitis C, cancer, and other therapeutic areas.

Bristol Myers Squibb agreed to pay around $2.5 billion in cash to buy Inhibitex Inc. in attempt to compete with Gilead/Pharmasset to produce hepatitis C drugs. The settlement will be finished in 2 months for its Inhibitex's shareholders acceptance of 126% premium price of its price over the previous 20 trading days ended on January 6. AstraZeneca, which already collaborated on several diabetes treatments with BMS, agreed to pay US$3.4 billion in cash for the right to continue development of Amylin's products. Two years later,  the company divested Amylin to AstraZeneca.

In April 2014, BMS announced its acquisition of iPierian for up to $725 million.

In February 2015, the company acquired Flexus Biosciences for $1.25 billion. As part of this deal, BMS will gain full rights to Flexus' lead small molecule IDO1-inhibitor, F001287.  In November, the company acquired the cardiovascular disease drug developer Cardioxyl for up to $2.075 billion. The deal strengthens the BMS' critical pipelines with the phase II candidate for acute decompensated heart failure, CXL-1427.

In March 2016, the company announced it would acquire Padlock Therapeutics for up to $600 million. In early July, the company announced it would acquire Cormorant Pharmaceuticals for $520 million, boosting BMS' oncology offering through Cormorants monoclonal antibody targeted against interleukin-8.

In August 2017 the company acquired IFM Therapeutics for $300 million upfront, with contingency payments of $1.01 billion due on certain milestones – allowing BMS to better compete against Merck & Co's cancer rival treatment, Keytruda.

In early January 2019, the company announced it would acquire Celgene (NASDAQ:CELG) for $74 billion ($95 billion including debt), in a deal that would become the largest pharmaceutical-company acquisition ever.  The Celgene acquisition aimed to be a refresher to the company's pipeline, helping to overcome from declining sales of Opdivo relative to competitor Keytruda.  Under the terms of the deal, Celgene shareholders would receive one BMS share as well as $50 in cash for each Celgene share held, valuing Celgene at $102.43 a share; representing a 54% premium to the previous days closing price.  Investor opposition to this acquisition, leading into an April 12 shareholder vote, appeared when BMS's second-largest investor, Wellington Management, voiced its opposition, followed by investor Starboard Value. In April 2019 BMS announced that 75% of its shareholders voted to approve the pending merger with Celgene. Transaction to close in the third quarter of 2019, subject to regulatory approvals. Newly issued BMS shares and CVRs will commence trading on the New York Stock Exchange, with the CVRs trading under the symbol 'BMYRT'.

The strategic divestment of the company's consumer health business, UPSA, to Taisho completed in 2019.  UPSA focused product delivery on France and the rest of Europe.  As early as 2005, the company had divested individual consumer products, and its US- and Canada-focused consumer products business.

In August, the Amgen announced it would acquire the Otezla drug programme from Celgene for $13.4 billion, as part of Celgene and BMS's merger deal.

In February 2020, BMS and partner Biomotiv launched a new company called Anteros Pharmaceuticals, which focuses on creating inflammation and fibrosis medicines. In August, the business announced it would acquire Forbius and its TGF-beta 1 & TGF-beta 3 inhibitors. In October, BMS announced it would acquire cardiology company MyoKardia for $13.1 billion ($225 per share) gaining control of mavacamten, a cardiovascular drug for obstructive hypertrophic cardiomyopathy (HCM), and the development of two key treatments: danicamtiv (MYK-491) and MYK-224.

In June 2022, BMS announced it would acquire Turning Point Therapeutics Inc for $4.1 billion in cash ($76 per share, a 122.5% premium to its last closing price), helping to boost its complement of cancer drugs, specifically repotrectinib.

List of mergers and acquisitions 
The following is an illustration of the company's major mergers and acquisitions and historical predecessors:

Bristol-Myers Squibb (Formed by the merger of Squibb Corporation (Est 1858) and Bristol-Myers (Est 1887))
 Adnexus Therapeutics
 ConvaTec
 Kosan Biosciences
 Medarex (Acq 2009)
 ZymoGenetics (Acq 2010)
 Amira Pharmaceuticals
 Inhibitex Inc (Acq 2012)
 Amylin Pharmaceuticals (Acq 2012 jointly with AstraZeneca)
 iPierian (Acq 2014)
 Flexus Biosciences (Acq 2015)
 Cardioxyl (Acq 2015)
 Padlock Therapeutics (Acq 2016)
 Cormorant Pharmaceuticals (Acq 2016)
 IFM Therapeutics (Acq 2017)
 Celgene (Acq 2019)
 Signal Pharmaceuticals, Inc (Acq 2000)
 Anthrogenesis (Acq 2002)
 Pharmion Corporation (Acq 2008)
 Gloucester Pharmaceuticals (Acq 2009)
 Abraxis BioScience Inc (Acq 2010)
 Avila Therapeutics, Inc (Acq 2012)
 Quanticel (Acq 2015)
 Receptos (Acq 2015)
 EngMab AG (Acq 2016)
 Delinia (Acq 2017)
 Impact Biomedicines (Acq 2018)
 Juno Therapeutics (Acq 2018)
 AbVitro (Acq 2016)
 RedoxTherapies (Acq 2016)
 Forbius (Acq 2020)
 MyoKardia (Acq 2020)
 Turning Point Therapeutics (Acq 2022)

Finances 
For the fiscal year 2018,Bristol Myers Squibb reported earnings of US$1.007 billion, with an annual revenue of US$20.776 billion, an increase of 6.9% over the previous fiscal cycle. Bristol-Myers Squibb's shares traded at over $55 per share, and its market capitalization was valued at over US$81.6 billion in October 2018. In 2018, 85% of the company's revenues came from just five products. In 2018, Bristol-Myers Squibb spent 36% of its total revenue on R&D expenses. Bristol-Myers Squibb ranked 145th on the Fortune 500 list of the largest United States corporations by revenue in 2018.

Carbon footprint
Bristol Myers Squibb reported Total CO2e emissions (Direct + Indirect) for the twelve months ending 31 December 2020 at 278 Kt (-6 /-2.1% y-o-y). The company aims to become net neutral carbon by 2040.

Pharmaceuticals

The following is a list of key pharmaceutical products:

Cardiovascular diseases
Avalide (irbesartan/hydrochlorothiazide) – comarketed with Sanofi
Avapro (irbesartan) – comarketed with Sanofi
Coumadin (warfarin)
Eliquis (apixaban) – comarketed with Pfizer
Plavix (clopidogrel) – comarketed with Sanofi
Pravachol (pravastatin)

Diabetes mellitus
Bydureon (exenatide extended-release) – marketed by BMS only in some countries
Byetta (exenatide) – marketed by BMS only in some countries, such as Russian Federation
Farxiga/Forxiga (dapagliflozin)
Glucophage (metformin) – marketed by BMS only in USA
Glucophage XR (metformin extended release) – marketed by BMS only in USA
Glucovance (Glyburide/metformin) – marketed by BMS only in USA
Kombiglyze XR/Komboglyze (saxagliptin/metformin extended release) – comarketed with AstraZeneca
Onglyza (saxagliptin) – comarketed with AstraZeneca

Infectious diseases, including HIV infection and associated conditions
Atripla (efavirenz/emtricitabine/tenofovir disoproxil fumarate) – comarketed with Gilead Sciences
Azactam (aztreonam)
Baraclude (entecavir)
Daklinza (daclatasvir)
Evotaz (atazanavir/cobicistat)
Megace (megestrol acetate)
Reyataz (atazanavir)
Sustiva/Stocrin (efavirenz)
Videx (didanosine)
Videx EC (didanosine delayed-release)
Zerit (stavudine)

Inflammatory disorders
Kenalog-10 (triamcinolone acetonide)
Kenalog-40 (triamcinolone acetonide)

Oncology
Abecma (idecabtagene vicleucel)
BiCNU (carmustine)
Breyanzi (lisocabtagene maraleucel)
CeeNU (lomustine)
Droxia/Hydrea (hydroxycarbamide)
Empliciti (Elotuzumab)
Erbitux (cetuximab)
Etopophos (etoposide)
Ixempra (ixabepilone)
Lysodren (mitotane)
Megace (megestrol acetate)
Opdivo (nivolumab) is a programmed death receptor blocking antibody used for the treatment of unresectable or metastatic melanoma and metastatic squamous non-small-cell lung carcinoma. In contrast to traditional chemotherapies and targeted anti-cancer therapies, which exert their effects by direct cytotoxic or tumor growth inhibition, nivolumab acts by inducing the immune system to attack the tumor.
Sprycel (dasatinib)
Taxol (paclitaxel). At one time, BMS held the solitary contract to harvest the bark of endangered yew trees on United States territory for the manufacture of chemotherapy drug paclitaxel (Taxol). Current paclitaxel production comes from renewable sources. BMS also held the original paclitaxel license, but there are now multiple generic producers.
Vumon (teniposide)
Yervoy (ipilimumab)

Psychiatry
Abilify (aripiprazole comarketed with Otsuka Pharmaceutical)

Rheumatic disorders
Orencia (abatacept)

Transplant rejection
Nulojix (belatacept)

Out of production 
Sal Hepatica
Ipana

Divested brands
(Former Bristol-Myers brands, now divested)

Bufferin
Excedrin
Ban Deodorant
Vitalis (hair tonic)
Ammens (medicated powder)
Final Net (hair spray)
Comtrex (cold relief capsules)
Keri (lotion)

Products under development

The following is a selective list of investigational products under development, as of 2015:

 Beclabuvir (BMS-791325) – phase III
 BMS-906024 – phase I
 BMS-955176 – phase II
 Brivanib alaninate (BMS-582664) – development terminated
 Elotuzumab (BMS-901608) – phase III
 Fostemsavir (BMS-663068) – approved in the United States in July 2020
 Lirilumab (BMS-986015)
 Lulizumab pegol (BMS-931699) – phase II

Public-private engagement 
Bristol-Myers Squibb engages with the public and private sectors in a variety of settings including to promote research and development, academic funding, event sponsorship, philanthropy, and political lobbying.

Academia and education 

 Institute for Advanced Study - Gift matching and direct donor.
 Mentoring in IBD - Sponsor.
 Northern Ontario School of Medicine (NOSM) - Donor.
 Population Health Research Institute (PHRI) at McMaster University Medical School - Partner.
 University of Toronto - Donor.
 University of Washington - Donor.

Conferences and events 

 Women in Medicine Summit - Sponsor.
 World Neuroscience Innovation Forum - Sponsor.

Healthcare 

 Centre for Addiction and Mental Health (CAMH) - Donor.
 Princess Margaret Cancer Centre (PMCC) - Foundation donor and sponsor for the PMCC Conference.
 Scarborough Health Network (SHN) - Donor to the Scarborough Health Foundation.
 SickKids - Donor to the SickKids Foundation.
 Sinai Health System - Donor to the Sinai Health Foundation.
 Sunnybrook Health Sciences Centre - Donor.

Media 

 National Geographic Society - Donor.
 National Press Foundation - Funder.

Medical societies 

 American Society of Hematology (ASH) - Corporate supporter.
 Arthritis Society - National corporate partner.
 Canadian Society of Internal Medicine - Sponsor.
 European Society of Cardiology - Sponsor.
 Spanish Cardiac Society - Partner.

Political lobbying 

 BIOTECanada - Member company. BIOTECanada lobbies the Canadian government for policies favourable to the pharmaceutical industry.
 Innovative Medicines Canada - Member.
 International Federation of Pharmaceutical Manufacturers & Associations (IFPMA) - Member.
 National Health Council - Member.
 National Pharmaceutical Council - Member.
 Personalized Medicine Coalition - Member.
 Pharmaceutical Advertising Advisory Board - Client.
 Pharmaceutical Research and Manufacturers of America - Member.
 Research!America - Member.

Professional associations 

 Canadian Association of Emergency Physicians (CAEP) - Corporate partner.
 Canadian Rheumatology Association (CRA) - Corporate sponsor.
 CARE Faculty - Sponsor. CARE is a Canadian coalition of medical specialists based in Oakville, Ontario. BMS was a sponsor for their 2021 Winter Hematology Update event.
 Colorectal Cancer Canada (CRC) - Sponsor.
 Health Products Stewardship Association - Member.

Research and development 

 Lung Health Foundation - Partner.
 Multiple Sclerosis International Federation - Partner.
 Pinnacle Research Group - Sponsor.
 Radcliffe Cardiology - Industry partner.

Scandals
Bristol-Myers Squibb, Johns Hopkins University and the Rockefeller Foundation are currently the subject of a $1 billion lawsuit from Guatemala for "roles in a 1940s U.S. government experiment that infected hundreds of Guatemalans with syphilis". A previous suit against the United States government was dismissed in 2011 for the Guatemala syphilis experiments when a judge determined that the U.S. government could not be held liable for actions committed outside of the U.S.

See also
 List of biotech and pharmaceutical companies in the New York metropolitan area

Notes and references

External links

 Bristol-Myers Squibb worldwide locations
Bristol-Myers Squibb Influence and Lobbying Summary – Opensecrets.org

 
1920s initial public offerings
American companies established in 1887
Manufacturing companies based in New York City
Multinational companies based in New York City
Biotechnology companies of the United States
Companies listed on the New York Stock Exchange
Pharmaceutical companies established in 1887
Pharmaceutical companies of the United States
Publicly traded companies based in New York City
1887 establishments in New York (state)
National Medal of Technology recipients
Orphan drug companies
Life sciences industry